Christmas EP may refer to:
 Christmas EP (Mary Margaret O'Hara EP), 1991
 Christmas EP (Seven Nations album)
 Christmas EP 2004, by Seven Nations
 Christmas EP (Aaron Shust EP), 2009
 Christmas EP (The Fray album)
 Christmas (Delta Goodrem EP), 2012
 Christmas (Pet Shop Boys EP)
 Christmas (Jimmy Eat World EP)
 Christmas (Low EP)